Bokeloh bat lyssavirus (BBLV) is negative-sense, single-stranded RNA virus of the genus Lyssavirus first isolated from a Natterer's bat (Myotis nattereri) found in Bokeloh, Lower Saxony, Germany in 2010.

References 

Lyssaviruses
Zoonoses